Dalongdong Baoan Temple also known as the Taipei Baoan Temple is a Taiwanese folk religion temple built in the Datong District, Taipei, Taiwan. The present temple was originally built by clan members in Tong'an, Xiamen, Fujian, who immigrated to Taipei in the early 19th century and gave the temple the name Po-an in order to "protect those of Tong'an" (保佑同安). The Taipei Confucius Temple is located adjacent to the Baoan Temple.

History
The temple construction commenced in 1804 and replaced a previously existing wooden shrine from 1742 in Toaliongtong (modern-day Dalongdong). Throughout the 20th century during the Japanese period, the temple underwent numerous improvements and extensions, which resulted in the present temple grounds. In 1985, the Taiwan government conferred on the temple the status of level two historic monument and after years of neglect and abuse, in 1995 the temple was the focus of repairs and renovations. In 2003, the temple was inducted into the UNESCO Asia-Pacific Heritage Awards for Culture Heritage Conservation.

Transportation
The temple is accessible within walking distance west of Yuanshan Station of Taipei Metro.

See also
Bangka Lungshan Temple
Bangka Qingshui Temple
Xingtian Temple
Ciyou Temple
Guandu Temple
Taipei Confucius Temple, located nearby Baoan Temple.

References

External links

Dalongdong Baoan Temple website
Dalongdong Baoan Temple Virtual tour  This virtual tour created by students during their visit.
Dalongdong Baoan Temple 

1804 establishments in Taiwan
Religious buildings and structures completed in 1804
Taoist temples in Taipei
National monuments of Taiwan